Eric Mory (born 17 April 1879) was a Swiss footballer who played as striker or midfielder during the 1890s and early 1900s.

Football career
FC Basel was founded on 15 November 1893 and Mory joined the club about three years later, during their 1896–97 season. Mory played his first game for the club in the away game on 8 November 1896 as Basel were defeated 1–2 by Grasshopper Club.

Mory stayed with the club for two seasons. During the first season he played in six of the teams seven matches and in the second he played in nine out of ten matches. The last game that Mory played for Basel was on 8 May 1898 as Basel won 2–0 against FC Fortuna Zürich. His teammate John Tollmann acted as referee in that match.

Following his time in Basel, Mory moved across the city and joined local rivals BSC Old Boys.

The Swiss Football Association (ASF-SFV) was formed in 1895 and was a founder member of FIFA in 1904. The following year the Swiss national football team played their first official international match against France on 12 February 1905. Mory played his only international for the Swiss team in this match, which was played at the Parc des Princes in front of 500 supporters. France won the match 1–0 with the only goal coming from Gaston Cyprès.

Notes

Footnotes

References

Sources
 Rotblau: Jahrbuch Saison 2017/2018. Publisher: FC Basel Marketing AG. 
 Die ersten 125 Jahre. Publisher: Josef Zindel im Friedrich Reinhardt Verlag, Basel. 
 Verein "Basler Fussballarchiv" Homepage
(NB: Despite all efforts, the editors of these books and the authors in "Basler Fussballarchiv" have failed to be able to identify all the players, their date and place of birth or date and place of death, who played in the games during the early years of FC Basel.)

FC Basel players
Swiss men's footballers
Association football midfielders
Association football forwards
1879 births
Date of death missing